Curicó, meaning "Black Waters" in Mapudungun  (originally meaning "Land of Black Water"), is the capital city of the Curicó Province, part of the Maule Region in Chile's central valley.

The province lies between the provinces of Colchagua and Talca and extends from the Pacific to the Argentine frontier.

Demographics
Of these, 130,506 (84%) lived in urban areas and 19,079 (16%) in rural areas. Between the 1992 and 2002 censuses, the population grew by 14.9% (15,472 persons).

Geography
The eastern and western sides are mountainous, separated by the Chilean Central Valley. A volcano called Descabezado Grande can be seen from most parts at a distance of eighty kilometers. The commune spans an area of.

The main rivers are the Lontué River and Teno River, which surround the city. The landscape is dominated by the Andes and Chilean Coastal Range.

Climate
Curicó has a warm-summer Mediterranean climate (Köppen climate classification Csb), relatively hot dry summers (November to March) with temperatures reaching  on the hottest days. In August 2007, Curicó experienced snowfall for the first time in over 60 years.

In the southern part of the valley the climate is more temperate and rainfall more abundant; the effects of this are to be seen in better pasturage. Irrigation is used to a large extent.

History

Curicó was founded in 1743 by Jose Manso de Velasco during the Spanish reign in the Americas (see Captaincy General of Chile).

The oldest and most valuable building of the city is La Iglesia San Francisco (San Francisco's Church), built in 1734, and came to its current location in 1759.

Curicó gained the title of "city" in 1830.

The city's hero is Luis Cruz Martínez, a Chilean soldier from the War of the Pacific, who died in 1882 in Perú.

The city was destroyed by an earthquake in 1928 and rebuilt during the following year.

The city was badly damaged in the February 2010 earthquake. An Argentine Air Force Mobile Field Hospital, similar to the one deployed in Haiti was deployed to the city  and remained on site until September

Economy

The city's economy is based mainly on agriculture. The Mediterranean-type climate encourages crops of orchard fruit and  viticulture.

Other industries are cement and sugar production.

In human development the city had 0.716 (UNDP, Chile 2000), reaching the 97th position in the municipalities of Chile  .

Tourism and Society

Between March 15 and 20 each year, the city celebrates a wine celebration: the Fiesta de la Vendimia (Wine Harvest Festival). The region has a La Ruta del Vino (The Wine Route), in Curicó Valley. It is also known as "the city of cakes" (made from manjar, meringue and fruit).

The Plaza de Armas (Main Square) is the most visited public place (declared a "Typical Zone"). There is a monument to Lautaro carved on the trunk of a beech tree, created by the craftsman of Vichuquén, Heraclio "Kako" Calquín. Located around Plaza de Armas are the mayor's house (alcaldía) and the governor's house.

A few blocks from the plaza, the Alameda Antonio Manso de Velasco avenue crosses the city with its gardens and leafy trees. There is also the Condell hill, a place which offers a panoramic view of the city and the San Francisco church.

Education
The city has two universities:

 Universidad de Talca (Traditional-Public), 
 Universidad Católica del Maule (Traditional-Religious), 

Higher-education institutions:
 Instituto Profesional DuocUC of the Pontificia Universidad Católica de Chile
 Instituto Profesional AIEP of the Universidad Andrés Bello

Media
The city has one of the oldest newspapers in Chile, La Prensa de Curicó (Press of Curico), founded in 1898. Before the earthquake of 2010, its offices were located in front of the central square, but have been relocated since because the building collapsed.

Notable people
 

Jorge Eduardo Álvarez (born 1990), Chilean footballer

Sports
Curicó is known for its bicycle culture. Many Chilean cyclists of international level started riding in the city, such as Marco Arriagada, Marcelo Arriagada and Luis Fernando Sepúlveda.

The local football team is Club Provincial Curicó Unido.

Administration
As a commune, Curicó is a third-level administrative division of Chile administered by a municipal council, headed by an alcalde who is directly elected every four years. Currently, the 2012-2016 alcalde is Javier Muñoz Riquelme.

Within the electoral divisions of Chile, Curicó is represented in the Chamber of Deputies by Roberto León (PDC) and Celso Morales (UDI) as part of the 36th electoral district, together with Teno, Romeral, Molina, Sagrada Familia, Hualañé, Licantén, Vichuquén and Rauco. The commune is represented in the Senate by Juan Antonio Coloma Correa (UDI) and Andrés Zaldívar Larraín (PDC) as part of the 10th senatorial constituency (Maule-North).

Sources

    History of Curicó by Tomás Guevara
 Information about cultural life and tourism.
 Report about urbanization in Latin American cities.

See also
  Census of Population in Chile

External links
  Official Website
  News about Curico
 Information about Wine Route
 Satellite Images of Curico by Google Maps

 
Populated places in Curicó Province
Capitals of Chilean provinces
Communes of Chile
Populated places established in 1743
1743 establishments in the Spanish Empire